The Stearman XA-21 (Model X-100) was a competitor in a United States Army Air Corps competition for a twin-engined attack aircraft which (after redesigns) led to the Douglas A-20 Havoc, Martin A-22 Maryland and North American B-25 Mitchell.

Design and development
The X-100, designated XA-21 following purchase by the Army Air Corps, was a twin-engined high-winged monoplane of all-metal construction. Its initial design featured an unusual "stepless cockpit" arrangement, much like those on most German World War II bombers designed during the war years from the He 111P onwards, with a streamlined, well-framed greenhouse canopy enclosing both the pilot and bombardier stations.

Operational history
The XA-21 was first tested with the streamlined cockpit but this configuration was found to restrict the pilot's forward vision, and the aircraft was rebuilt with a conventional (stepped) nose and cockpit structure. Although this change in the cockpit did not significantly affect performance, the XA-21 was not ordered into production.'

The sole XA-21 had serial number 40-191.

Operators

United States Army Air Corps

Specifications (XA-21)

See also

References

Notes

Bibliography

 Bowers, Peter M. Boeing Aircraft since 1916. London: Putnam, Second edition, 1989. .
 Wagner, Ray. American Combat Planes of the 20th Century, Third Enlarged Edition. New York: Doubleday, 1982. .

External links

 "Stearman XA-21"

A-21, Stearman
A-21
Shoulder-wing aircraft
Aircraft first flown in 1938
Twin piston-engined tractor aircraft